Ulta is a mountain in the Cordillera Blanca in the Andes of Peru, about  high (although Peruvian IGN map cites an elevation of ). It is in the region of Ancash.

References 

Mountains of Peru
Mountains of Ancash Region